Costria is a genus of moths in the family Cossidae. Species are found in South America (Brazil, Colombia, French Guiana).

Species 
 Costria abnoba (Schaus, 1901)
 Costria elegans Schaus, 1901
 Costria okendeni (Druce, 1906)

 Names brought to synonymy
 Costria arpi (Schaus, 1901), a synonym for Cossula arpi
 Costria corita (Schaus, 1901), a synonym for Simplicivalva corita
 Costria discopuncta (Schaus, 1901), a synonym for Spinulata discopuncta
 Costria maruga (Schaus, 1901), a synonym for Spinulata maruga
 Costria striolata (Schaus, 1901), a synonym for Simplicivalva striolata

References

External links 

 
 Costria at insectoid.info

Cossulinae
Cossidae genera